Ciermięcice  (or formerly Tirmanz) is a village located in Poland, in the Opole Voivodeship, Głubczyce County and Gmina Głubczyce. 

Through the village flows the Potok Ciermięcicki ( or "Thirmický potok"), the left tributary of the Opava river in Krnov.

References

Villages in Głubczyce County